Lanesville Heritage Weekend is a festival in Lanesville, Indiana that celebrates the history and heritage of Indiana farmers and small towns such as Lanesville. It was first held as the Lanesville Bicentennial Celebration, in honor of the United States Bicentennial. In the 21st century, the four-day festival draws an estimated 70,000 visitors each year.

History
The Lanesville Heritage Weekend is traditionally held the weekend starting the second Friday in September. The festival started in 1976 with a $500 federal grant, on old-time steam engine and a dozen antique tractors on display. It expanded to a four-day festival in 2016.

The festival showcases antique farm machinery and craft skills, with demonstrations of  broom making and wood-turning, weaving, and of the process of making sorghum and brooms. wood-turning and woodcarving, in addition to showcasing old-time machinery used in sawmills, threshing.

2020 saw no festival.

Events
The events held at Lanesville Heritage Weekend help to celebrate the town and its history. They events include:
a display of antique motors
an antique tractor display
an old saw mill demonstration
plowing fields using old techniques such as the plow and oxen
a show of antique farm equipment
demonstrations of old techniques used to make foods like apple butter, sorghum, and soap
a tractor pull
live bluegrass music
a parade down Main Street
a Queen & Princess Contest
an 8- and 2-mile run
a 5-mile walk
different food booths
carnival rides
a hot-air balloon race
helicopter rides

References

External links

Festivals in Indiana
Tourist attractions in Harrison County, Indiana
Festivals established in 1976
1976 establishments in Indiana